Armando Crispino (18 October 1924 – 6 October 2003) was an Italian film director and screenwriter. He was born in Biella, Piedmont. He directed nine films between 1966 and 1975. He also wrote for nine films between 1965 and 1975. He also directed two Italian horror films, Autopsy and The Dead Are Alive.

Selected filmography
 Pleasant Nights (1966 - director)
 Commandos (1968 - director)
 The Dead Are Alive (1972 - director) (aka "The Etruscan Kills Again") 
 Autopsy (1975 - director) (aka "Macchie Solari"/ "Sunspots")

References

External links

1924 births
2003 deaths
People from the Province of Biella
Italian film directors
Giallo film directors
Italian male screenwriters
20th-century Italian male writers
20th-century Italian screenwriters